Greear is a surname. Notable people with the surname include:

J. D. Greear (born 1973), American Southern Baptist minister
Mike Greear (born 1967), American politician

See also
Greer (surname)

Surnames of Greek origin